Spice and Wolf is an anime television series adapted from the light novel series of the same name by Isuna Hasekura and Jū Ayakura. The episodes are directed by Takeo Takahashi and animated and produced by Imagin. The story follows a 25-year-old man traveling merchant named Kraft Lawrence who meets Holo, a female wolf deity of wheat. Holo, bound to a nearby town by an old promise to ensure good harvest, escapes with Lawrence when the townspeople stopped believing in her. Lawrence takes her north toward her homeland, Yoitsu, and she helps him with his business transactions in return.

The first season of the anime aired between January 9 and March 26, 2008 on the Chiba TV Japanese television network, and was later released on six DVD compilation volumes, each containing two episodes, though the first compilation contains three episodes. The volumes were released between April 2 and August 29, 2008 by Pony Canyon. The third volume, released on May 30, 2008, contains episode six of the television broadcast in addition to the unaired episode seven, which is included as an original video animation (OVA). A Blu-ray Disc (BD) box set of the series was released on January 30, 2009 in Japan by Pony Canyon. The anime is licensed for release in English by Kadokawa Pictures USA and Funimation Entertainment, and a complete 13-episode Region 1 DVD box set was released on December 22, 2009 in North America.

A second season of the anime titled Spice and Wolf II aired 12 episodes between July 9 and September 24, 2009. These episodes were released on four BD/DVD compilation volumes, each of which contains three episodes, between October 7, 2009 and January 6, 2010. Most of the staff from the first season returned, though Toshimitsu Kobayashi replaced Kazuya Kuroda as the character designer and chief animation director and Brain's Base managed the animation instead of Imagin. The script for both seasons was written by Naruhisa Arakawa, and the voice actors from the first season retained their roles. Another OVA, animated by Brain's Base, was released bundled with a picture book, written and illustrated by the light novel creators, entitled . The bundle was released by ASCII Media Works on April 30, 2009 under their Dengeki Bunko Visual Novel imprint. Funimation licensed Spice and Wolf II and released the series in English on August 2, 2011.

In an interview by Darren Kwok, author Isuna Hasekura laid to rest speculation regarding the release of a third season.

Two pieces of theme music are used for each season: one opening theme and one ending theme. The background music soundtrack for both seasons is written by Yuji Yoshino.

Episode list

Spice and Wolf

Spice and Wolf II

See also

List of Spice and Wolf light novels
List of Spice and Wolf chapters

Notes

References

Spice and Wolf